Manuel Misquita was a former Mayor of Karachi under the British Raj and President of Karachi Goan Association.

Mayor
Misquita was elected Mayor of Karachi in 1945 becoming the first and to date its only Catholic mayor.

Karachi Goan Association
Misquita twice served as President of the Karachi Goan Association, first time from 1941 to 1942 and then again in 1954.

References

External links
 Presidents of Karachi Goan Association

Pakistani people of Goan descent
Pakistani Roman Catholics
Mayors of Karachi
Politicians from Karachi
Year of birth missing
Year of death missing